Nick Koenig, better known by his stage name Hot Sugar, is an American record producer from New York City, New York. He is the owner of the Noise Collector record label. He starred in the 2015 documentary film Hot Sugar's Cold World.

Career
In 2011, Hot Sugar released his debut EP, Muscle Milk. In that year, he produced the Roots' song "Sleep", which was included in their Undun album. In 2012, he released the Moon Money EP, as well as the Midi Murder EP. In 2013, he released the Made Man EP. In that year, he produced Kitty's song "Barbie Jeep". In 2015, his debut studio album, God's Hand, was released on Break World Records. He starred in Adam Bhala Lough's Hot Sugar's Cold World, which received an honorable mention at the 2015 Hot Docs Canadian International Documentary Festival. In 2017, he released a studio album, The Melody of Dust. 

Hot Sugar's music has been used in Broad City. He has collaborated with Antwon, Lakutis, Heems, Big Baby Gandhi, and Chippy Nonstop, among others. He has also directed music videos for Lil Peep's "Awful Things", Marshmello and Lil Peep's "Spotlight", and the Smashing Pumpkins' "Solara".

Style and influences
According to Complex, Hot Sugar's music is called "associative music, where he pulls in a ton of sounds from instruments, found sounds, and non-traditional places to sample them into his own melodies." He has been perfecting the technique since the age of 13. In a 2015 interview with NPR, he described associative music as "try[ing] to capture sounds the same way a photographer would capture an image: If something looks poetic, I'll record it".

In a 2015 interview with Nylon, Hot Sugar stated that Kenneth Anger and John Waters are very important to him. He said: "Their influence on modern culture is incalculable and their work is timelessly innovative."

Personal life
Hot Sugar has dated Molly Soda and Kitty.

Controversy
In June 2018, Hot Sugar filed a defamation lawsuit against Ricky Eat Acid and Fish Narc, stating that they "are co-conspirators who have engaged in libel and slander, among other unlawful acts, against [Hot Sugar] over the course of years including recently through various social media publications such as Twitter and Wikipedia." He initially sought at least $100,000 in damages, and reached settlements with both of them in August 2018.

Discography

Studio albums
 God's Hand (2015)
 The Melody of Dust (2017)
 Candlelight (2020)
 Torchlight (2020)
 Atlas (2020) 
 Screenlight (2022)

Compilation albums
 Solid Steel Mix (2012)
 Seductive Nightmares 1 (2013)
 Seductive Nightmares 2 (2014)
 Skeletons (2014)
 Seductive Nightmares 3 (2016)

EPs
 Muscle Milk (2011)
 Moon Money (2012)
 Midi Murder (2012)
 Made Man (2013)
 Mob Mentality (2019)
 Life Support (2019)

Filmography

Feature films
 Hot Sugar's Cold World (2015)

References

External links
 
 

Living people
Year of birth missing (living people)
Musicians from New York (state)
American hip hop record producers
American electronic musicians